Mareuil-sur-Arnon (literally Mareuil on Arnon) is a commune in the Cher department in the Centre-Val de Loire region of France.

Geography
The commune shares its north-western border with the departement of Indre.

Population

Sights
 The church of St. Pierre, rebuilt in the nineteenth century.
 A watermill.
 The ruined towers of a feudal castle.

See also
Communes of the Cher department

References

Communes of Cher (department)